The Microturbo TRS 18 is a small, low thrust turbojet designed and built in France in the 1970s. It was installed on both manned and unmanned aircraft.

Design and development

The TRS 18 was originally designed for self-launching motor gliders but was adapted to power conventional ultralight aircraft and unmanned vehicles (RPV). It was originally designed and developed by Sermel, a competitor company to Microturbo which the latter took over in 1971. It is a simple, low thrust, reverse flow single shaft engine with a centrifugal compressor and axial turbine. It is built in three modules: an intake section containing starter and lubrication systems; a centre section with compressor and turbine on ball bearings; and an aft section with the folded combustion chambers and tail-pipe.

It gained its US Federal Aviation Administration type certificate in May 1976.

Variants
Data from Jane's All the World's Aircraft 1984-85
TRS 18-046Production version, primarily intended for manned applications with full self start provision, oil lubrication and temperature and pressure transducers. 
TRS 18-056 Cut down gas generator or core engine version, fuel lubricated and only 62% the weight of the 18-046 version but the same thrust; intended for RPVs.
TRS 18-075 Intended respectively for the Flight Refuelling ASAT target drone. Includes an engine driven alternator and fuel and oil lubrication pumps. Dry weight as 18-046.  Take-off thrust increased to 1.15 kN (260 lb st) and maximum continuous thrust to 1.10 kN (247 lb st).
TRS 18-076 Intended for the Meteor-Mirach 100. Includes an engine driven alternator and fuel and oil lubrication pumps. Dry weight as 18-046.  Take-off thrust increased to 1.15 kN (260 lb st) and maximum continuous thrust to 1.10 kN (247 lb st).

Applications
Data from Jane's All the World's Aircraft 1984-85

Manned
Bede BD-5J
Caproni Vizzola A-21SJ
Chagnes Microstar (version of Rutan VariViggen)
EFF Prometheus 19
EFF Prometheus 12
Microjet 200
NASA AD-1 slew wing

Unmanned
Flight Refuelling ASAT
France-engins Mitsoubac
Meteor-Mirach 100

Specifications (TRS 18-046)

References

1970s turbojet engines
Centrifugal-flow turbojet engines